Ammuguda railway station  is a railway station in Hyderabad, Telangana, India located on the Manmad–Kacheguda section of South Central Railway. The Ammuguda, Neredmet, Ramakrishnapuram localities is accessible from this station.

Lines
Hyderabad Multi-Modal Transport System
Secunderabad–Bolarum route (BS Line)

External links

MMTS Timings as per South Central Railway

MMTS stations in Hyderabad
Hyderabad railway division
Railway stations in Hyderabad, India